is a Japanese swimmer. She competed in two events at the 1984 Summer Olympics.

References

External links
 

1964 births
Living people
Japanese female medley swimmers
Olympic swimmers of Japan
Swimmers at the 1984 Summer Olympics
Place of birth missing (living people)
Asian Games medalists in swimming
Asian Games gold medalists for Japan
Asian Games silver medalists for Japan
Swimmers at the 1982 Asian Games
Medalists at the 1982 Asian Games
20th-century Japanese women